WWWH could refer to:

WWWH (AM), a defunct radio station (1230 AM) licensed to Haleyville, Alabama, United States
WWWH-FM, a radio station (92.7 FM) licensed to Haleyville, Alabama, United States